Anatoly Sukharkov (born 10 February 1938) is a Soviet long-distance runner. He competed in the marathon at the 1968 Summer Olympics.

References

1938 births
Living people
Athletes (track and field) at the 1968 Summer Olympics
Soviet male long-distance runners
Soviet male marathon runners
Olympic athletes of the Soviet Union
Sportspeople from Kaliningrad